The Sâmbăta is a left tributary of the river Olt in Romania. It discharges into the Olt in Sâmbăta de Jos.

References

Rivers of Romania
Rivers of Brașov County